Farès Ziam (born March 21, 1997) is a French mixed martial artist who competes in the Lightweight division of the Ultimate Fighting Championship.

Background
Born into a Franco-Algerian family in 1997, he was a fan of mixed martial arts and Brazilian jiu-jitsu. It was a family affair, with everyone involved in combat sports. His father, Taïeb, who was a former pro boxer that hung up his gloves in the 2000s, has of course had something to do with it. His stepfather did Brazilian jiu-jitsu while his two brothers did Muay Thai. At 12, Ziam began practising combat sports with full contact. At 13, he began doing Brazilian jiu-jitsu, kickboxing and MMA once or twice a week. Starting at 14, he did judo, BJJ and kickboxing for 3 years, he then joined the Ezbiri team in Villeurbanne to do MMA professionally.

Mixed martial arts career

Early career
Starting his professional MMA career in 2014, Ziam compiled a 10–2 record fighting mostly in the regional European scene, winning the HIT and LFC lightweight championships in the process.

Ultimate Fighting Championship
Ziam, as a replacement for Magomed Mustafaev, made his promotional debut against Don Madge on September 7, 2019, at UFC 242 in Abu Dhabi, United Arab Emirates. Ziam lost the fight by unanimous decision.

Ziam faced Jamie Mullarkey at UFC Fight Night: Ortega vs. The Korean Zombie on October 18, 2020. He won the fight via unanimous decision.

Ziam faced Luigi Vendramini on June 12, 2021, at UFC 263. He won the fight via majority decision.

Ziam was scheduled to face Terrance McKinney on November 20, 2021, at UFC Fight Night 198. However, one of McKinney's cornermen got COVID-19 the day of the bout and it was scrapped. The pairing was rescheduled and eventually took place at UFC Fight Night 202 on February 26, 2022. Ziam lost the bout via first round rear-naked choke.

Ziam faced Michal Figlak on September 3, 2022 at UFC Fight Night 209. He won the fight via unanimous decision.

Championships and accomplishments 
 HIT Fighting Championship
 HIT Lightweight Championship (one time)
 Lyon Fighting Championship
 LFC Lightweight Championship (one time)

Mixed martial arts record

|-
|Win
|align=center|13–4
|Michal Figlak
|Decision (unanimous)
|UFC Fight Night: Gane vs. Tuivasa
|
|align=center|3
|align=center|5:00
|Paris, France
|
|-
|Loss
|align=center|12–4
|Terrance McKinney
|Submission (rear-naked choke)
|UFC Fight Night: Makhachev vs. Green 
|
|align=center|1
|align=center|2:11
|Las Vegas, Nevada, United States
|
|-
|Win
|align=center|12–3
|Luigi Vendramini
|Decision (majority)
|UFC 263
|
|align=center|3
|align=center|5:00
|Glendale, Arizona, United States
|
|-
|Win
|align=center|11–3
|Jamie Mullarkey
|Decision (unanimous)
|UFC Fight Night: Ortega vs. The Korean Zombie 
|
|align=center|3
|align=center|5:00
|Abu Dhabi, United Arab Emirates
|
|-
|Loss
|align=center| 10–3
|Don Madge
|Decision (unanimous)
|UFC 242 
|
|align=center|3
|align=center|5:00
|Abu Dhabi, United Arab Emirates
|
|-
| Win
| align=center| 10–2
| Yassine Belhadj
| Submission (guillotine choke)
| European Beatdown 5
| 
| align=center| 3
| align=center| 1:05
| La Louvière, Belgium
| 
|-
|Win
|align=center| 9–2
|Julio Matos
|Decision (unanimous)
|European Beatdown 4
|
|align=center|3
|align=center|5:00
|Mons, Belgium
|
|-
| Win
| align=center| 8–2
| Abner Lloveras
|KO (punch)
|HIT Fighting Championship 5
|
|align=center|2
|align=center|0:24
|Zurich, Switzerland
|
|-
| Win
| align=center| 7–2
| Alexey Valivakhin
| TKO (punches and elbows)
| WWFC 8
| 
| align=center| 1
| align=center| 3:01
| Kyiv, Ukraine
| 
|-
| Win
| align=center| 6–2
| Artem Tanshyn
| TKO (elbows)
| Road To WWFC 4
| 
| align=center| 1
| align=center| 3:18
| Kyiv, Ukraine
| 
|-
| Loss
| align=center| 5–2
| Haotian Wu
| Submission (rear-naked choke)
| Kunlun Fight MMA 7
| 
| align=center| 1
| align=center| 3:41
| Beijing, China
| 
|-
| Win
| align=center| 5–1
| Damien Lapilus
| KO (head kick)
| Lyon Fighting Championship 7
| 
| align=center| 1
| align=center| N/A
| Lyon, France
| 
|-
| Loss
| align=center| 4–1
| Viskhan Magomadov
| Submission (rear-naked choke)
| ACB 46
| 
| align=center| 1
| align=center| 3:58
| Olsztyn, Poland
| 
|-
| Win
| align=center| 4–0
| Laïd Zerhouni
| Submission (rear-naked choke)
| Gladiator Fighting Arena 3
| 
| align=center| 3
| align=center| 2:32
| Nîmes, France
| 
|-
| Win
| align=center| 3–0
| Jean Dutriaux
| Submission (arm-triangle choke)
| 100% Fight 27
|  
| align=center| 1
| align=center| 1:50
| Paris, France
|
|-
| Win
| align=center| 2–0
| Dominic Yeo
| TKO (punches)
| WSFC 3: The Third Strike
| 
| align=center| 2
| align=center| 4:58
| Dornbirn, Austria
|
|-
| Win
| align=center|1–0
| Guerra Mathias
| Submission (armbar)
| Lyon Fighting Championship 4
| 
| align=center|1
| align=center|4:12
| Lyon, France
|
|-

See also 
 List of male mixed martial artists

References

External links 
  
 

1997 births
Living people
French male mixed martial artists
Lightweight mixed martial artists
Ultimate Fighting Championship male fighters
French sportspeople of Algerian descent
French practitioners of Brazilian jiu-jitsu
Mixed martial artists utilizing Brazilian jiu-jitsu
People from Vénissieux
Sportspeople from Lyon Metropolis